Bruce Ward Carr (January 28, 1924 – April 25, 1998) was a highly decorated United States Air Force colonel. During World War II, he was shot down over Germany and, after evading capture for several days, snuck into a Luftwaffe airfield and stole an enemy plane which he flew back to Allied lines. He also became a flying ace credited with 14 or 15 aerial victories, including five in a single day, for which he was awarded the Distinguished Service Cross.

Early life and World War II 
Bruce W. Carr was born on January 28, 1924, in Union Springs, New York. He began flying at the age of 15 in 1939, and enlisted into the United States Army Air Forces on September 3, 1942. Carr entered the Aviation Cadet Training Program, where his military flight instructor happened to be the very same person who taught him to fly in 1939.

Due to his previous flying experience, Carr was placed in an accelerated training program, flying the P-40 Warhawk at Spence Field, Georgia. Acquiring over 240 flight hours, Carr was promoted to flight officer on August 30, 1943. 

Carr deployed to Europe in February 1944, where he was assigned to the 380th Fighter Squadron, 363rd Fighter Group, Ninth Air Force, at RAF Rivenhall in Essex, England. The 363rd was one of the first units to adopt the P-51 Mustang. Carr had never flown above 10,000 feet, but when he took the P-51 to an altitude of 30,000 feet, he was duly impressed and named his plane "Angel's Playmate."

Ace status 

On March 8, 1944, Flight Officer Carr scored his squadron's first kill, however, he was not given credit for it. Carr chased a German Messerschmitt Bf 109 to within a few feet off the ground, firing his guns the whole time. Only one bullet hit the enemy plane, and the pilot bailed out far too close to the ground and crashed. Carr said he scared the German pilot to death and caused him to kill himself.

Upon returning to the airfield, Carr was criticized by his leaders for being "overaggressive." In May, he was transferred to the 353rd Fighter Squadron, 354th Fighter Group, at RAF Lashenden in Kent. Claiming a probable kill over Normandy, France, on June 14, Carr scored his first official credit on June 17, when he assisted another pilot in downing an Focke-Wulf Fw 190. The next day, the squadron transferred to an airfield in France. On August 18, Carr was commissioned as a second lieutenant.

On September 12, Carr's flight strafed several Junkers Ju-88 bombers on an airfield in Germany. Later in that same mission, the flight spotted over 30 Fw 190s approximately 2,000 feet below them. Carr personally shot three from the sky before escorting a fellow pilot, whose aircraft was badly damaged, back to base. Carr was awarded the Silver Star for his actions that day.

Focke Wulf incident 

On November 2nd 1944, Carr took off on a mission and was shot down by flak while strafing ground targets over Czechoslovakia. He bailed out and landed near a Luftwaffe field with the intent of surrendering to the Luftwaffe troops, but it was becoming dark just as he got there. From the trees he watched as two mechanics fueled up an FW 190, and hatched a daring plan to escape by stealing that plane.

Near dawn he snuck out and jumped in the cockpit. Through experimentation, Carr was able to start the plane, and with Luftwaffe personnel already coming out to see what was going on he gunned it across a corner of the field on a path that had him pass between two hangars before he was airborne.

Managing to make it back to his home field in France, Carr was unable to lower the landing gear and was forced to make a belly up landing. Upon landing, he was presumed to be a hostile German pilot by the armed personnel at the airfield, until he was recognised by his group commander George R. Bickel.

Further war service 
On April 2, 1945, First Lieutenant Carr was leading three other aircraft on a reconnaissance mission near Schweinfurt, Germany, when he spotted 60 German fighters flying above them. Despite the enemy having an altitude advantage and outnumbering them, Carr led his flight in an attack and the pilots downed a total of 15 aircraft. Carr personally shot down two Fw 190s, three Bf 109s and damaged a sixth fighter. This feat made Carr the last ace in a day in the European Theater during the war and he was awarded the Distinguished Service Cross for his actions.

Carr was promoted to captain on April 9, and claimed several more aerial victories that month, claiming two final victories on April 25. Carr flew a total of 172 combat missions during the war, accumulating 14 or 15 confirmed air-to-air victories. He had several more unconfirmed victories and multiple ground kills.

Later career and life 
After the war, Carr was assigned to the Acrojets as an F-80 Shooting Star pilot at Williams Air Force Base, Arizona. The Acrojets, which preceded the Thunderbirds, were the United States Air Force's first jet-powered aerobatic demonstration team.

Major Carr later flew the F-86 Sabre in 57 combat missions with the 336th Fighter-Interceptor Squadron while stationed at Kimpo (K-14) Air Base in South Korea during the Korean War. He then served as the commanding officer of the 336th at Misawa Air Base in Japan, from January 1955 to August 1956.

On November 3, 1968, Carr was promoted to colonel, and deployed to Vietnam later that month. He was assigned to the 31st Tactical Fighter Wing at Tuy Hoa Air Base in South Vietnam. He flew the F-100 Super Sabre in 286 combat missions during the war, which mostly consisted of flying close air support bombing and strafing missions. Carr was awarded the Legion of Merit and three Distinguished Flying Crosses during his deployment, before he rotated back to the United States in November 1969.

Carr retired from the Air Force in 1973. He died of prostate cancer on April 25, 1998, in St. Cloud, Florida, and was buried in Arlington National Cemetery.

Awards and decorations
Carr's awards include the following:

Distinguished Service Cross

Citation:

References 

1924 births
1998 deaths
United States Air Force personnel of the Korean War
United States Air Force personnel of the Vietnam War
American Korean War pilots
American Vietnam War pilots
American World War II flying aces
Aviators from New York (state)
Burials at Arlington National Cemetery
Military personnel from New York (state)
Recipients of the Distinguished Service Cross (United States)
Recipients of the Silver Star
Recipients of the Legion of Merit
Recipients of the Distinguished Flying Cross (United States)
Recipients of the Air Medal
Shot-down aviators
United States Air Force colonels
United States Army Air Forces pilots of World War II
Deaths from prostate cancer
Deaths from cancer in Florida